The National Westminster Bank at 288 Green Lanes in Palmers Green, London, is a grade II listed building with Historic England. It was designed by Arthur Sykes in 1913.

Gallery

References

External links

Grade II listed buildings in the London Borough of Enfield
Palmers Green
Grade II listed banks
NatWest Group
Commercial buildings completed in 1913